Soichi Sakamoto (August 6, 1906 – September 29, 1997) was an American swimming coach who pioneered training methods that have now become standard throughout the sport. Many of his students went on to have great success nationally and internationally. He was inducted into the International Swimming, Hawaii Sports and American Swimming Coaches Association Halls of Fame, and is a member of the University of Hawaii Sports Circle of Honor.

Sakamoto was a sixth-grade science teacher at Puunene School in Maui, Hawaii, and initially knew little about swimming. Nonetheless, he established the Three-Year Swim Club in 1937 for the children of poor sugar plantation workers. The name of the club reflected his goal of getting his pupils on the Olympic team in three years. While his students did indeed qualify, the 1940 Summer Olympics were cancelled due to World War II. However, his team won the 1939, 1940 and 1941 Amateur Athletic Union national outdoor team championships. 

He was the swimming coach at the University of Hawaii from 1946 to 1961 and an assistant coach of the US Olympic Swim Team from 1952 to 1956. Beginning with the 1948 Summer Olympics, Sakamoto achieved his goal; a number of his pupils not only competed in the Olympics, they were medalists.

He was the first to use interval training in the sport. Lacking a pool, he had his students train in irrigation ditches, swimming against the current, a form of resistance training.

His students include:
 Takashi "Halo" Hirose - national 100-meter champion in 1941, NCAA champion, and three-time All-American
 Thelma Kalama - a member of the winning 1948 Olympics women's 4×100-meter freestyle relay team
 Evelyn Kawamoto - 1949 national champion in the 300-meter individual medley and 200-meter breaststroke, two-time bronze medalist at the 1952 Olympics
 Keo Nakama - world record holder for the mile
 Bill Smith - double gold medalist at the 1948 Olympics and world record holder in four events

In October 2015, Julia Checkoway published her book The Three-Year Swim Club: The Untold Story of Maui’s Sugar Ditch Kids and Their Quest for Olympic Glory (Grand Central Publishing, 2015), a New York Times bestseller according to Amazon.com.

References

1906 births
1997 deaths
American swimming coaches
Schoolteachers from Hawaii
Hawaii people of Japanese descent